The GCR Class 5A was a class of seven  steams designed by John G. Robinson for work in docks operated by the Great Central Railway. They passed to the London and North Eastern Railway at the grouping in 1923 and received the LNER classification J63.

History
The class was introduced in 1906 as a replacement for the GCR Class 4 dock shunters, based on his predecessor's GCR Class 5 but with side tanks rather than saddle tanks. A seventh locomotive was built in 1914.

All seven examples survived into British Railways ownership in 1948, at least one being at Immingham in 1952, and at least one at Connah's Quay in 1954. They were all withdrawn between 1953 and 1957.

References

Sources

External links
 The Robinson J63 (GCR Class 5) 0-6-0ST Locomotives; LNER Encyclopedia
 Images of J63s, with random others, via Yahoo

05A
0-6-0T locomotives
Railway locomotives introduced in 1906
Scrapped locomotives
Standard gauge steam locomotives of Great Britain

Shunting locomotives